Viscount Longueville was a title created twice, once in the Peerage of England and once in the Peerage of Ireland. On 21 April 1690, Henry Yelverton, 15th Baron Grey de Ruthyn was created Viscount Longueville in the Peerage of England. His son the second viscount, Talbot Yelverton, was created Earl of Sussex in 1717, with which title the viscountcy then merged, until both titles became extinct in 1799 on the death of the third Earl.

On 1 October 1795, Richard Longfield was created Baron Longueville, of Longueville in the County of Cork, and on 29 December 1800, he was created Viscount Longueville, of Longueville in the County of Cork. Both titles were in the Peerage of Ireland. Both titles became extinct on his death in 1811.

Viscounts Longueville; First creation (1690)
see Earl of Sussex

Viscount Longueville; Second creation (1800)
Richard Longfield, 1st Viscount Longueville (1734–1811)

See also
Yelverton baronets of Easton Mauduit
Baron Grey de Ruthyn
List of deserters from James II to William of Orange

References

Extinct viscountcies in the Peerage of Ireland
Extinct viscountcies in the Peerage of England
Noble titles created in 1690
Noble titles created in 1800